Melia Kreiling (born ) is an actress. She is known for her roles on television series such as Tyrant and The Last Tycoon, and for her starring role as Alycia in the second season of the CBS summer series Salvation. She also has a brief appearance in the film Guardians of the Galaxy.

Early life
Kreiling was born in Geneva, Switzerland in the late 1980s as the daughter of an American father, Randall A. Kreiling, and a Greek mother, Katia Dimopoulou. She grew up in Athens, where she attended an English school. Afterwards, she attended the National State School of Dance. After moving to Great Britain, she studied at the University of Winchester and the Northern School of Contemporary Dance in Leeds. She received additional acting education at the London School of Dramatic Art.

Career
Kreiling made her film debut in the 2011 short Room to Forget. In the German-speaking world she became known for her role in the historical drama The Borgias. In December 2012 she appeared in a television program about Rosamunde Pilcher and reprised her character in The Other Wife. She made a brief cameo in the American film Guardians of the Galaxy, in which she portrayed the character Bereet. Kreiling played Bathsheba in the 2013 History Channel miniseries The Bible. From 2015–2016, she played the recurring role of Daliyah Al-Yazbek in the FX television series Tyrant.

In February 2018 Kreiling joined the cast of the CBS summer series Salvation in its second season, playing the role of Alycia.

Filmography

References

External links

Actresses from Athens
Greek emigrants to the United States
21st-century American actresses
Living people
Year of birth uncertain
Year of birth missing (living people)